Ken Rose may refer to:

 Ken Rose (American football) (born 1962), American football linebacker
 Ken Rose (figure skater) (born 1986), Canadian figure skater
 Kenneth Rose (1924–2014), British journalist and royal biographer